Mary Walcott (July 5, 1675 –  1752) was one of the "afflicted" girls called as a witness at the Salem witch trials in early 1692-93.

Life
Born July 5, 1675, she was the daughter of Captain Jonathan Walcott (1639–1699), and his wife, Mary Sibley (or Sibly; 1644–1683), both of Salem, and was about seventeen years old when the allegations started in 1692. Her aunt, Mary (née Wolcott), the wife of Samuel Sibley (or Sibly; 1657–1708), was the person who first showed Tituba and Tituba's husband John Indian how to bake a "witch cake" to feed to a dog in order that she and her friends might ascertain exactly who it was that was afflicting them. Joseph B. Felt quoted in The Annals of Salem (1849 edition) vol. 2, p. 476 [from the town records]:

March 11, 1692, – "Mary, the wife of Samuel Sibley, having been suspended from communion with the church there, for the advice she gave John [husband of Tituba] to make the above experiment, is restored on a confession that her purpose was innocent."

Marriage
Mary Walcott married Isaac Farrar, son of John Farrar of Woburn, Massachusetts, on April 28, 1696. They had several children, and eventually moved to Townsend, Massachusetts. She married, secondly, to David Harwood in 1701 in Sutton, Massachusetts. They had nine children:

 Mary Harwood, b. Abt. 1702.; d. Abt. 1753. 
 Emma Harwood, b. Abt. 1705. (m. Ebenezer Macintyre, May 23, 1728). 
 Hannah Harwood, b. Abt. 1706; (m. Ebenezer Twiss, Abt. 1752). 
 David Harwood, b. Abt. 1708, Salem, Essex County, Massachusetts; d. August 22, 1781, Sutton, Worcester County, Massachusetts; (m. Margaret Cox, March 13, 1730/31, Salem, Essex Cnty, Massachusetts). 
 Elizabeth Harwood, b. Abt. 1711; d. Abt. 1738; (m. Benjamin Moulton, October 1734). 
 Ezra Harwood, b. Abt. 1715. 
 Alice Harwood, b. Abt. 1720, Salem, Massachusetts (m. Jonathan Nourse Jr., August 12, 1743). 
 Absalom Harwood, b. Abt. 1723; (m. Anna Boyce, September 23, 1748). 
 Solomon Harwood, b. Abt. 1725; (m. Abagail Phelps, December 20, 1748; m. Sarah Taylor December 4, 1752).

Later years
They moved to Sutton about 1729, leaving most of their children living in Salem. David was a weaver by occupation. David died before 1744. Mary Walcott Harwood probably died before 1752.

Sources

References

External links
University of Virginia: Salem Witch Trials (includes former "Massachusetts Historical Society" link)

1675 births
Year of death unknown
Accusers in witch trials
People of the Salem witch trials
People from Townsend, Massachusetts
Place of birth missing